Mahaveera  is a 1988 Indian Hindi-language film, directed by Naresh Saigal and starring Raaj Kumar, Dharmendra, Shatrughan Sinha, Raj Babbar, Dimple Kapadia in pivotal roles.

Story 
Dharam is a poor farmer, who lives in rural India with his family consisting of his pregnant wife, a son, Deepak alias Deepu. The lecherous and cunning Thakur Amrit Singh would like to take over Dharam's cultivated plot of land but he refuses to give up this land and is knifed to death by the Thakur with his wife giving birth to a daughter, Dolly in the process. Due to the poverty of the family both brother and sister are unable to afford an education so Dolly decides to take up employment as a maid in Thakur Sher Singh mansion in order to send Deepu abroad to take police training. In the mean-while Sher Singh attempts to sexually molest Dolly but her luck hold out and she run off with a bandit, Diler Singh only to become an outlaw - not only to evade her poverty but to avenge the austerities mediate out to her and her family. When Deepu return as a police officer his first assignment is to arrest his sister much to his shock as he had never associate his sister of having any connection with unlawful activities.

Cast
 Raaj Kumar as DSP Karamveer / Don (Double Role) 
 Dharmendra as Inspector Ajay Verma
 Shatrughan Sinha as Vijay Verma
 Raj Babbar as Inspector Deepak
 Dimple Kapadia as Dolly
 Dara Singh as Daku Diler Singh
 Prem Chopra as Thakur Sher Singh
 Raza Murad as Thakur Amrit Singh
 Utpal Dutt as Lala Karamdas
 Vinod Mehra as Dharam
 Anita Raj as Dancer / Singer
 Salma Agha as Dancer / Singer

Soundtrack

References

External links
 

1988 films
1980s Hindi-language films
Films scored by Kalyanji Anandji